Morne la Vigie is an extinct scoria cone, located 9.4 km from the commune of Saut-d'Eau and 21 km from Port-au-Prince, it was active from Pleistocene until around the 400,000 years ago.

References 

Pleistocene volcanoes
Volcanoes of Haiti